Yanagita (written: , lit. "willow ricefield") is a Japanese surname. Notable people with the surname include:

, Japanese scholar
, Japanese women's footballer
, Japanese baseball player

See also
Yanagita Station, a railway station in Yokote, Akita Prefecture, Japan

Japanese-language surnames